Fabiana Harumi Sugimori (born 1 December 1980) is a retired Brazilian Paralympic swimmer who competed in international level events. She was born prematurely and her vision was severely damaged by the oxygen in an incubator that she was treated in.

References

1980 births
Living people
Sportspeople from Campinas
People from Piracicaba
Paralympic swimmers of Brazil
Swimmers at the 1996 Summer Paralympics
Swimmers at the 2000 Summer Paralympics
Swimmers at the 2004 Summer Paralympics
Swimmers at the 2008 Summer Paralympics
Medalists at the 2000 Summer Paralympics
Medalists at the 2004 Summer Paralympics
Medalists at the 2008 Summer Paralympics
Paralympic medalists in swimming
Paralympic gold medalists for Brazil
Paralympic bronze medalists for Brazil
Medalists at the 2003 Parapan American Games
Medalists at the World Para Swimming Championships
Brazilian female freestyle swimmers
Brazilian female medley swimmers
Brazilian female breaststroke swimmers
S11-classified Paralympic swimmers
20th-century Brazilian women
21st-century Brazilian women